Hal Sirowitz (born 1949) is an American poet.

Sirowitz first began to attract attention at the Nuyorican Poets Cafe where he was a frequent competitor in their Friday Night Poetry Slam. He eventually made the 1993 Nuyorican Poetry Slam team, and competed in the 1993 National Poetry Slam (held that year in San Francisco) along with his Nuyorican teammates Maggie Estep, Tracie Morris and Regie Cabico.

Sirowitz would later perform his poetry on stages across the country, and on television programs such as MTV's Spoken Word: Unplugged and PBS's The United States of Poetry.

He has written six books on poetry and is arguably best known for the volumes Mother Said, My Therapist Said and Father Said.

Sirowitz is a 1994 recipient of an NEA Fellowship in Poetry and is the former Poet Laureate of Queens, New York. He worked as a special education teacher in the New York public school system for 23 years.
He is married to the writer Mary Minter Krotzer.

Sirowitz abroad 
Sirowitz is the best-selling translated poet in Norway, where Mother Said has been adapted for the stage and turned into a series of animated cartoons.

References

External links 
Hal Sirowitz performing "Chopped Off Arm" (podcast)

1949 births
American male poets
Living people
Jewish American writers
Performance art in New York City
Place of birth missing (living people)
20th-century American poets
20th-century American male writers
21st-century American Jews